Anatol Codru (1 May 1936 – 17 August 2010) was a writer and film director from Moldova. He was the head of the Union of Cinematographers of Moldova and a leader of the Democratic Forum of Romanians in Moldova.

Biography
Anatol Codru was born to Ion Condrea and Titiana Stăncuţă on May 1, 1936, in Molovata Nouă. He graduated from Moldova State University in 1963. Since 1998, he has been the head of the Union of Cinematographers of Moldova. Anatol Codru is an honorary member of the Academy of Sciences of Moldova Anatol Codru was suffering from cancer and died in Chişinău on August 17, 2010.

Awards
 Premiul I pentru poezie al prestigioasei reviste literare din Moscova „Drujba narodov", 1976.
 Filmul Mihai Eminescu este distins cu Premiul I la Festivalul de poezie din Suceava, 1992.
 Premiul Uniunii Scriitorilor din Moldova pentru cea mai bună carte de poeme a anului, Intâmplarea mirării, 1999.
 Academia Internaţională de drept economic îi acordă titlul de Doctor Honoris Causa.2000
 Medalia "Mihai Eminescu", Guvernul României

Books
 Nopţi albastre (1962)
 Îndărătnicia pietrei (1967)
 Feciori (1971)
 Portret în piatră (1978)
 Piatra de citire (1980)
 Mitul personal (1986)
 Bolta cuvântului (1997)

Filmography
 Trânta (1968)
 Biografie (1969)
 Alexandru Plămădeală (1969) composer Arkady Luxemburg
 Bahus (1969)
 Arhitectul Sciusev (1970)
 Dimitrie Cantemir (1971)
 Din îndemnul talentului (1971)
 Vasile Alecsandri (1972)
 Carnetul de partid (1973)
 Biografia cântecului (1973)
 Plai reînnoit (1975)
 Neam de pietrari (1975)
 Balada prietenului meu (1978)
 Visul vieţii mele (1980) composer Arkady Luxemburg
 Letopiseţul destinului nostru (1981)
 Puşkin în Moldova (1982)
 Starşinaua Mahail Varfolomei (1983)
 Te salut, nouă generaţie (1983)
 În constelaţia fraternităţii (1984)
 Tălăncuţa (1986)
 Cronica familiei Bologan (1987)
 Sînt acuzaţi martorii (1988)
 Eu, Nicolai Costenco (1989)
 Mihai Eminescu (1992)
 Ion Creangă (1998)

Scenarist
 Dimitrie Cantemir (1971)
 Ion Creangă (1973)
 Trânta  (1977)

References

Bibliography
 *** - Literatura şi arta Moldovei: Enciclopedie (Chişinău, 1985–1986)
 Mihail Dolgan - Anatol Codru. Mitul personal (Chişinău, Ed. Literatura artistică, 1986)

External links 
 Poet, patriot şi mare român
 FILMOGRAFIE
 Anatol Codru
 Web-enciclopedia filmului moldovenesc - Anatol Codru
 Webpagina lui Anatol Codru
 Oamenii Transnistriei. Poet, patriot şi mare român

1936 births
2010 deaths
Moldova State University alumni
Moldovan writers
Moldovan male writers
Moldovan activists
People from Dubăsari District
Moldovan film directors